The second Wahpeton (YTM-757) was a yard tug placed in commission in the United States Navy in 1968 and sold in 1974.

The U.S. Navy acquired the tug LT-2084 from the United States Army in April 1968. Placed in service as medium harbor tug Wahpeton and designated YTM-757, she soon thereafter was assigned to the 14th Naval District and served the United States Pacific Fleet.

During her time in U.S. Navy service, she was one of two U.S Navy tugs named Wahpeton, the other being .

Taken out of service in the early 1970s, Wahpeton was struck from the Navy List and sold in September 1974. She became the commercial tug Lynne.

References

External links
NavSource Online: Service Ship Photo Archive US Army Large Tug LT-2084 Wahpeton (YTM-757)

Tugs of the United States Navy
1954 ships